Phillip Bent (born 16 September 1964) is an English jazz flautist from London, England, who was a member of the GRP All-Star Big Band. He has made references to a number of musicians as his inspiration, including Bobbi Humphrey, James Newton, Kathryn Lukas (his teacher), William Bennett, and James Galway.

Discography

As leader 
 The Pressure (1993)
 The Magic of Your Spell (2007)

As sideman 
With GRP All-Star Big Band
 GRP All-Star Big Band (1992)
 Dave Grusin Presents GRP All-Star Big Band Live! (1993)
 All Blues (1995)

With others
 Jazz Warriors, Out of Many, One People (1987)
 Ronny Jordan,  The Antidote (1992)
 Galliano,  A Joyful Noise Unto The Creator (1992)
 The Prodigy, Music For The Jilted Generation, 3 Kilos ( 1994 ) 
 Des'ree, Endangered Species (2000)

References

1964 births
Living people
English jazz flautists
GRP Records artists
Jazz Warriors members
GRP All-Star Big Band members